Pacific Adventure is a  operated by P&O Cruises Australia, a subsidiary of Carnival Corporation & plc. In 1998, Princess Cruises finalized the order for the ship (then known as the Golden Princess) in response to the strong demand for her sister ship, Grand Princess, making her the fleet's second Grand-class ship. She was built by Italian shipbuilder Fincantieri in Monfalcone, delivered in 2001, and christened by Merlisa George in Saint Thomas in April 2002. While operating as Golden Princess, she has sailed to all seven continents, beginning with her debut in Southampton in May 2001, followed by seasonal deployments serving regions around the Caribbean and Europe. In 2007, she circumnavigated South America and debuted along the West Coast of the United States before also sailing around ports in Asia and Oceania bordering the Pacific Ocean until 2020.

In 2017, Carnival Corporation announced Golden Princess would be transferred from Princess to sister brand P&O Cruises Australia as a part of P&O's fleet renewal. She is currently in service as Pacific Adventure as of 2022, sailing itineraries around Oceania along with her sister ship Pacific Encounter (previously known as Star Princess).

Construction 
In January 1998 Princess announced it was ordering two additional Grand-class ships at a cost of approximately US$425 million each from Italian shipbuilder Fincantieri for delivery in 2001.

The first ship, named Golden Princess, was floated out on 31 August 2000 in Monfalcone. She sailed her maiden voyage on May 16, 2001. She was originally planned to be christened by Jane Seymour on 12 October 2001, but was later christened by Merlisa George, Miss US Virgin Islands 2002, on 17 April 2002 in Saint Thomas.

Design and specifications

Princess made several changes to the design of Golden Princess compared with Grand Princess, including a modified stern. Princess commissioned Golden Princess to have similar dimensions to Grand Princess: they both measure  and have an approximate capacity of 2,600 passengers. Golden Princess is powered by a diesel-electric genset system, with six Sulzer engines: four producing  and two producing . Main propulsion is via two diesel-electric propellers. The ship has 1,299 passenger cabins and 627 crew cabins. She has a maximum capacity of 4,160 passengers and crew.

On board, Golden Princess retains much of the design of Grand Princess, aside from several changes. Instead of the slanted bulkheads of the tiered decks below her sister ship's navigation bridge, she has flat bulkheads. Additionally, in order to reduce the ship's weight, she features a modified stern made of lighter materials, particularly in the "handle," which housed the ship's nightclub.

Covid-19

The 2019–2020 season marked the last active season that the ship sailed as Golden Princess. She began with weekly Alaska voyages in summer 2019 before returning to Melbourne in fall 2019. In March 2020, during a round-trip sailing from Melbourne to New Zealand amid the COVID-19 pandemic, three passengers were quarantined onboard after one was suspected of having the coronavirus when they began developing symptoms. At the time of the announcement, the ship was bound for Akaroa and proceeded to anchor in Akaroa Harbour to allow for medical officials to test the guests, who ultimately tested negative. The remainder of the voyage was subsequently cancelled and the ship was cleared to return to Melbourne, following the Australian government's ordinance for all cruise ships to return to their homeports. The ship returned on 19 March 2020 and all guests finally disembarked around 6:00pm after some of the guests were tested earlier in the day, and none of those tests returned positive. Golden Princess was scheduled to perform a full season of Alaska voyages from Los Angeles in summer 2020 and a final transpacific crossing to Singapore in fall 2020, but due to the pandemic, all sailings of the ship were suspended. There were rumors of the vessel possibly being sold for scrap instead of being transferred to P&O Australia, but Carnival Corporation denied the rumors and later did transfer the vessel.

Pacific Adventure

Background 
In December 2015, Carnival Corporation announced it had ordered a new 4,200-passenger ship from Fincantieri for Princess' sister brand, P&O Cruises Australia, as a part of its "fleet enhancement plan." The new ship, scheduled for delivery in 2019, would become P&O's first-ever new-build vessel and its largest ship overall in the fleet. However, in December 2016, the order for the new ship was transferred to sister brand Carnival Cruise Line (CCL) in exchange for Carnival Splendor joining the P&O fleet instead. In a statement, P&O president Sture Myrmell conceded that the market's current infrastructure and its anticipated pace of development would be inadequate to support the brand's earlier, more ambitious expansion goals. But in September 2017, Carnival issued a further fleet realignment, announcing Golden Princess would transfer to P&O, with Carnival Splendor continuing to operate for CCL. In September 2018, after hosting an online naming contest, P&O announced Golden Princess would be renamed Pacific Adventure and debut in October 2020, featuring modified accommodations and onboard facilities designed in-line with the P&O brand.

Service 
In October 2018, P&O unveiled the inaugural schedule for Pacific Adventure, with cruises of various lengths from Australian ports, visiting New Zealand, Fiji, Papua New Guinea, and other destinations in Oceania, beginning in October 2020. However, the COVID-19 pandemic led P&O to halt its operations, and this delayed the ship's debut until 2022. Australian cruises were suspended in March 2020, with the ban finally being lifted on April 17 2022. The ship was transferred in October 2020, but she did not enter service until 2022 because of the COVID-19 pandemic.

Golden Princess transitioned into P&O's fleet in 2022 as Pacific Adventure, her guest capacity has been increased to 2,636, with modifications including the addition of five-berth cabins. P&O also invited the public to contribute suggestions in order to design a more family-oriented experience on the ship. Other new features will consist of a new adults-only lounge space and a recreational park. The ship has been renovated in Trieste, Italy.

References

External links 

Archived page of Golden Princess  (via Princess Cruises)
 Golden Princess Fact Sheet  (via Princess Cruises)

2000 ships
Ships of Princess Cruises
Ships built in Monfalcone
Ships built by Fincantieri
Cruise ships involved in the COVID-19 pandemic